Belfast Commando was a light infantry regiment of the South African Army. It formed part of the South African Army Infantry Formation as well as the South African Territorial Reserve.

History

Origin
This commando was established on the farm Tweefontein near Belfast in the Eastern Transvaal (now Mpumalanga) in 1890. It was named after the capital city of Northern Ireland.

Operations

With the Zuid Afrikaanse Republiek

This commandos registered battle honours include:
 Sekoekoei in 1876, 
 Eerste Vryheids Oorlog of 1880–81, 
 Modjadji of 1890,
 Maguba of 1895, 
 Mpefu of 1898,
 Anglo Boer War of 1899-1902

With the UDF
By 1902 all Commando remnants were under British military control and disarmed.

By 1912, however previous Commando members could join shooting associations.

By 1940, such commandos were under control of the National Reserve of Volunteers.

These commandos were formally reactivated by 1948.

With the SADF
During the SADF period, this commando was responsible for area protection and fell under the command of Group 28 at Middleburg, part of Eastern Transvaal Command.

With the SANDF

Disbandment
This unit, along with all other Commando units was disbanded after a decision by South African President Thabo Mbeki to disband all Commando Units. The Commando system was phased out between 2003 and 2008 "because of the role it played in the apartheid era", according to the Minister of Safety and Security Charles Nqakula.

Unit Insignia
This units first emblem was the crowned crane. The shoulder flash displayed was authorised in 1980.

Leadership

References

See also 
 South African Commando System

Infantry regiments of South Africa
South African Commando Units